Cossus kerzhneri is a moth in the family Cossidae. It is found in Mongolia.

References

Natural History Museum Lepidoptera generic names catalog

Cossus
Moths described in 2011
Moths of Asia